African-American names are an integral part of African-American tradition. While many black Americans use names that are popular with wider American culture, a number of specific naming trends have emerged within African-American culture. Black names are often derived from existing Biblical names, African names, Arabic and Muslim names, French names, and other European names.

History

It is widely held that prior to the 1950s and 1960s, most African-American names closely resembled those used within European-American culture. Even within the White-American population, a few very common names were given to babies of that era, with nicknames often used to distinguish among various people with the same name. It was also quite common for immigrants and cultural minorities to choose baby names or change their names to fit in within the wider American culture. This applied to both given names and surnames.

Recent research by economic historians Lisa D. Cook, John Parman and Trevon Logan has found that distinctive African-American naming practices happened as early as in the Antebellum period. However, those early names are no longer used by Black people.

Paustian has argued that black names display the same themes and patterns as those in West Africa.

With the rise of the 1960s Civil Rights Movement and the wider counterculture of the 1960s, there was a dramatic rise in African-American names of various origins. San Diego State University professor Jean Twenge believes that the shift toward unique black-American baby names is also the result of the cultural shift in America that values individuality over conformity.

In 2004, Fryer et al. examined the rapid change in naming practices in the early 1970s, with the rapid adoption of distinctively black names, especially in low-income, racially isolated neighborhoods. They favor an explanatory model which attributes a change in black perceptions of their identity to the Black Power Movement.

Influences and conventions
Lieberson and Mikelson of Harvard University analyzed black names, finding that the recent innovative naming practices follow American linguistic conventions even if they are independent of organizations or institutions. Given names used by African-American people are often invented or creatively-spelled variants of more traditional names. Some names are created using fashionable syllables, for example the prefixes La- or De- and the suffixes -ique or -isha. Also, punctuation marks like apostrophes and dashes are sometimes used (though infrequently).

French names 
While creoles of color historically had classical French names, many names of French origin entered the picture during the 1950s and 1960s. Opinions on the origins of the French influence vary, but historically French names such as Monique, Chantal,  André, and Antoine became so common within African-American culture that many Americans began to think of them solely as "black names". These names are often seen with spelling variations such as Antwan, Antwaun or Antwon (Antoine) or Shauntelle (Chantal).

Afrocentric and inventive names

The Afrocentrism movement that grew in popularity during the 1970s saw the advent of African names among African-Americans, as well as names imagined to be African sounding. Names such as Ashanti have African origins. The Black Power movement inspired many to show pride in their heritage. Harvard University sociologist Stanley Lieberson noted that in 1977, the name "Kizzy" rose dramatically in popularity following the use of the name in the book and television series Roots.

By the 1970s and 1980s, it had become common within African-American culture to invent new names. Many of the invented names took elements from popular existing names. Prefixes such as La/Le, Da/De, Ra/Re, or Ja/Je and suffixes such as -ique/iqua, -isha (for girls), -ari and -aun/awn (for boys) are common, as well as inventive spellings for common names. The book Baby Names Now: From Classic to Cool—The Very Last Word on First Names places the origins of "La" names in African-American culture in New Orleans. The name LaKeisha is typically considered American in origin but has elements drawn from both African and French roots.

Apostrophes are seen more often within African-American names than other American names, such as the names Mo'nique and D'Andre.

In his dictionary of black names, Cenoura asserts that in the early 21st century, black names are "unique names that come from combinations of two or more names, names constructed with common prefixes and suffixes...'conjugated' with a formula..." "Da", "La", and related sounds may originate from the French spoken in Louisiana. Attached to a common name such as Seán and spelled phonetically, one obtains "DaShawn". Diminutive suffixes from French, Spanish and Scottish such as "ita" may be combined directly with prefixes or to a name, as is often found in white naming or nicknaming. Conventions followed usually make the person's gender easily identifiable. Following Spanish, masculine names often end in "o", e.g. "Carmello", while feminine names end with "a", e.g. "Jeretta". Following Irish, French and Italian, apostrophes may be used, e.g. "D'Andre" and "Rene'e". Parents' names may be blended, e.g. the son of "Raymond" and "Yvonne" might be named "Rayvon".

Muslim names 

Islam has been an influence upon African-American names. Islamic names entered African-American culture with the rise of The Nation of Islam among black Americans with its focus upon black advocacy. The popular names Aisha, Aaliyah, and others are also examples of names derived from Islam.

A number of African-American celebrities began adopting Muslim names, including Muhammad Ali, who changed his name in 1964 from Cassius Marcellus Clay, Jr. Other celebrities adopting Muslim names include Kareem Abdul-Jabbar (formerly Lew Alcindor) and Amiri Baraka (formerly LeRoi Jones). Despite the Muslim origin of these names and the place of the Nation of Islam in the Civil Rights Movement, many Muslim names such as Jamal and Malik entered popular usage among black Americans simply because they were fashionable, and many Islamic names are now commonly used by African Americans regardless of religion.

European and Biblical names
Even with the rise of created names, it is also still common for African Americans to use biblical, historic, or European names. Daniel, Christopher, Michael, David, James, Joseph, and Matthew were among the most common names for African-American boys in 2013.

Workplace discrimination 
In recent years it has become evident that workplace discrimination exists on the basis of names. A recent study concluded that applicants with traditionally “Black names” have a 2.1% fewer chance of getting a call back after an interview. Studies done at the University of Chicago and the University of California Berkeley in which over 83,000 entry-level job applications were submitted and results showed that 7% of all jobs in the experiment were prejudiced against traditionally "Black names." This research concludes that candidates with more "ethnically-sounding" names were less likely to get a call back.

See also
 Naming in the United States
 Arabic name
 Stereotypes of African Americans

References

Further reading
 
 Tan, Hui Ren (2022). "Black and White Names: Evolution and Determinants". The Journal of Economic History. 82 (4): 959–1002.
 

African-American culture
Names by culture
North American given names